is a private university in Chiyoda, Tokyo, Japan. The predecessor of the school was founded in 1877, and it was chartered as a university in 1949.

External links
 Official website 
 Official website 

Educational institutions established in 1877
Private universities and colleges in Japan
Universities and colleges in Tokyo
1877 establishments in Japan